Jilin North railway station is a railway station of Jilin–Shulan Railway. The station located in the Longtan District of Jilin, Jilin province, China.

See also
Jilin–Shulan Railway

References

Railway stations in Jilin